"Battle School" is the second episode of the third series of the British comedy series Dad's Army. It was originally transmitted on Thursday, 18 September 1969.

Synopsis
The Home Guard go on a weekend guerrilla warfare exercise. If they ever manage to find it, they have to capture their Captain's HQ.

Plot
The platoon are travelling by train to a battle school in the country. Save for an incident involving Godfrey's weak bladder, the journey is uneventful. Disaster strikes when they arrive at the station; Mainwaring opens the secret instructions, and it is clear that he doesn't know how to read a map. They start off confidently, but it's not long before they find themselves back at the station. They try again and Mainwaring leads them into an ambush led by a rugged captain.

When they finally reach the school, they are greeted by a cheery Major Smith, who then proceeds to tell them that, to the platoon's horror, they have missed the evening meal by four hours. He introduces them to Captain Rodrigues, a tough Spanish officer (the one who had led the ambush) who fought in the Spanish Civil War and doesn't approve of military disciplines such as arm-waving. He gives Mainwaring and the platoon a "Palliasse" and a single blanket each to keep them warm as well as some carrots and onions to eat. Most of the men are annoyed at all this and at Mainwaring for their late arrival (except for Jones, who still characteristically trusts him).

Rodrigues wakes up the sleeping platoon late in the morning with a thunderflash, telling them that they have missed breakfast as well. Rodrigues hints that they will have an opportunity to capture his HQ; unfortunately no one has succeeded due to the fierce Alsatians, barbed wire and the electrified fence. The men are soon put to the test, which involves various misfortunes for Mainwaring, such as falling into a deep river, falling from a deliberately cut rope during a Tyrolean traverse and clumsily falling into the mud while crossing some balance beams. Meanwhile, Walker, fed up with the lack of food, is determined to search for something good at a nearby farm, but is scared off by the unimpressed farmer.

By lunchtime, the platoon are handed what is clearly a quickly-made meal. As the exercise continues, Mainwaring falls down a hole, finds a secret tunnel and discovers it leads to Rodrigues' HQ. Later that night having been missing all afternoon, he returns to take the platoon through the tunnel and they end up in the food stores. Walker is impressed, and it isn't long before the HQ is captured. 

On the train home, Mainwaring is relieved to find himself in his men's good graces again, though laments that he felt the platoon deserved a more tangible reward. Walker then reveals that he is fully laden with food as whilst the others were dealing with Rodrigues, he was cleaning out the stores.

Cast

Arthur Lowe as Captain Mainwaring
John Le Mesurier as Sergeant Wilson
Clive Dunn as Lance Corporal Jones
John Laurie as Private Frazer
James Beck as Private Walker
Arnold Ridley as Private Godfrey
Ian Lavender as Private Pike
Alan Tilvern as Captain Rodrigues
Alan Haines as Major Smith
Colin Bean as Private Sponge

Notes
 The opening shot of the episode was taken from The Titfield Thunderbolt released in 1953. Stock footage was required as the location being used for their arrival was Wendling railway station, which had recently been closed by British Railways. Wendling station was also used on the episode "The Day the Balloon Went Up".
 The area where the main exterior filming took place was also used for the new shots for the end credits (necessitated as the end credits for the previous two series had been filmed in black and white). A reminder of this episode was therefore present for the rest of the run of Dad's Army, with the cast walking past the trees in front of which the Spanish Captain is briefly seen standing holding a megaphone, and the shot of the platoon running across an open heath was used at the very end of all subsequent episodes under the producer's credit.
 The idea of the platoon getting lost on their way to a training base and subsequently missing supper and breakfast was re-used in the 1971 film.
 When the platoon are trying to find the battle school, they are whistling the tune of "Who Do You Think You Are Kidding, Mr Hitler?", the opening theme song of the series.

Historic background
The "Battle Camp" is similar to the school of guerrilla warfare that existed in Osterley Park at the beginning of the war. Like the one in the episode, the real life camp instructed Home Guardsmen in irregular warfare in case of Nazi invasion. The Osterley camp was even run by Spanish Civil War veteran Tom Wintringham, much like the one in the episode.

Further reading

External links

Dad's Army radio episodes
Dad's Army (series 3) episodes
1969 British television episodes